It Happened in Honolulu is a 1916 American silent comedy film directed by Lynn Reynolds and starring Myrtle Gonzalez, Val Paul and George Hernandez.

Cast
 Myrtle Gonzalez as Mabel Wyland
 Val Paul as Larry Crane
 George Hernandez as Mr. Wyland
 Lule Warrenton as Mrs. Wyland
 C. Norman Hammond as Jim Crane
 Fred Church as Clarence Velie
 Bertram Grassby as Lord Percy
 Jack Curtis as Detective Boggs

References

Bibliography
 Robert B. Connelly. The Silents: Silent Feature Films, 1910-36, Volume 40, Issue 2. December Press, 1998.

External links
 

1916 films
1916 comedy films
1910s English-language films
American silent feature films
Silent American comedy films
American black-and-white films
Universal Pictures films
Films directed by Lynn Reynolds
1910s American films